Events in the year 2015 in Latvia.

State officials

Events

January
 January 1:
 Latvia joined the European Union presidency, replacing Italy;
 electricity market opening.
 January 16 — Latvia to the European Commission was transfer 1.2 billion euros from the 2009 loan.

May

June
June 3 — 2015 Latvian presidential election: Raimonds Vējonis of the Green Party is elected President.

July
 July 1 — Luxembourg joined the European Union presidency, replacing Latvia;
 July 8 — Raimonds Vējonis replaced Andris Bērziņš in post of President of Latvia.

September
 In the autumn of 2015 was the largest grain harvest in Latvian history.

October
 October 26 —  In Garkalne Municipality on A2 road truck knocked down a children training team of Riga Cycling school, suffered an accident 13 people.

December
 December 1 — service was transferred to the restored building of the Latvian National Museum of Art.
 December 7 — Prime minister Laimdota Straujuma announced her resignation.

Deaths
February 7 — Baiba Caune, cyclist (b. 1945)
April 5 — Pāvels Kovaļovs, triple jumper (b. 1990)
September 17 - Ingrīda Andriņa, stage and film actress (b. 1944)
September 23 — Kārlis Zariņš, opera singer (b. 1930)

References

 
2010s in Latvia
Years of the 21st century in Latvia
Latvia
Latvia